Constadina Bonaros is an Australian politician. She has been an SA Best member of the South Australian Legislative Council since the 2018 state election.

Career
Bonaros has undergraduate degrees in Laws and Arts (Modern Greek and Social Politics) from the University of Adelaide. She had worked as a lawyer from 2003 until 2006 before becoming an advisor to Nick Xenophon for over 12 years. In 2007, Bonaros served as Xenophon's campaign manager. From 2007 she served in John Darley's office, running second on the ticket to Darley at that years election. She left Darley's office to join Senator Stirling Griff's office as his chief of staff when he was elected at the 2016 federal election. Bonaros was campaign manager for SA Best during the 2018 election campaign, at which the party won two seats in the upper house (Bonaros and Frank Pangallo).

In 2020, Connie stated that fellow politician Sam Duluk slapped her bottom but the courts found him not guilty. Another politician, Tammy Franks has also accused him of similar actions.

Personal life
Bonaros is married and has one child.

References

Year of birth missing (living people)
Living people
Members of the South Australian Legislative Council
Women members of the South Australian Legislative Council
Nick Xenophon's SA-BEST members of the Parliament of South Australia
University of Adelaide alumni
21st-century Australian politicians
21st-century Australian women politicians